Berchemia lineata is a climbing plant in the family Rhamnaceae. It occurs naturally in dry thickets in the rainshadows of the central Asian mountains. B. lineata is found from northern China to Nepal, but is also cultivated in gardens.

Uses
It is a medicinal plant of the Chinese traditional medicine. Berchemia giraldiana is used similarly.

Bibliography
 中药大辞典, 1995. Shanghai: 上海科学技术出版社, 1986, 1857–1858.

External links

 Plants for a Future's database

lineata
Flora of China
Plants used in traditional Chinese medicine